Jack Brown (born 27 July 2001) is a Scottish professional footballer who plays for Peterhead, as a midfielder.

Career
Brown began his career with Inverness Caledonian Thistle, and was one of 10 youth players to turn professional with the club in May 2018. He made his senior debut on 27 January 2018, in a 3–1 league defeat away at Falkirk.

In July 2019, he was one of nine Inverness players loaned to Fort William in the Highland Football League.

After the club was furloughed in 2020 due to COVID-19, Brown was one of many youth players released after it was decided that it was financially unwise for the club to have wage bills for players not getting any game time. Following this he was signed on by Rothes in the Highland League, leaving Inverness with only one appearance to his name.

In January 2022, it was announced that Brown had been signed to Peterhead.

References

2001 births
Living people
Scottish footballers
Inverness Caledonian Thistle F.C. players
Peterhead F.C. players
Rothes F.C. players
Fort William F.C. players
Scottish Professional Football League players
Highland Football League players
Association football midfielders
Sportspeople from Highland (council area)